Marcantonio or Marc'Antonio is a masculine Italian given name. Notable people with the name include:

Marcantonio Amulio (1506–1572), Venetian diplomat and cardinal
Marcantonio Barbarigo (1640–1706), Italian cardinal
Marcantonio Barbaro (1518–1595), Italian diplomat
Marcantonio Bellavia, 17th-century Italian painter
Marcantonio Bobba (died 1575), Italian Roman Catholic bishop and cardinal
Marcantonio Borghese, 5th Prince of Sulmona (1730–1800)
Marcantonio Bragadin (disambiguation), multiple people
Marcantonio Campeggi (died 1553), Italian Roman Catholic bishop
Marcantonio Canini (1622–1669), Italian painter and sculptor
Marcantonio Chiarini (c. 1652 – 1730), Italian Baroque painter
Marcantonio Colonna (disambiguation), multiple people
Marcantonio Dal Re (1697–1766), Italian engraver and publisher
Marcantonio De Beaumont-Bonelli, Italian sailor
Marcantonio della Torre (1481–1511), Italian anatomist
Marcantonio Dordi (1598–1663), Italian painter
Marcantonio Durando (1801–1880), Italian Roman Catholic priest
Marcantonio Flaminio (died 1550), Italian poet
Marcantonio Franceschini (1648–1729), Italian Baroque painter
Marcantonio Genovesi (died 1624), Italian Roman Catholic bishop
Marcantonio Genua (1491–1563), Italian philosopher
Marcantonio Giustinian (1619–1688), Doge of Venice
Marcantonio Gozzadini (1574–1623), Italian cardinal
Marc'Antonio Ingegneri, 16th-century Italian Renaissance composer
Marcantonio Maffei (1521–1583), Italian Roman Catholic bishop and cardinal
Marcantonio Marcolini (1721–1782), Italian Roman Catholic bishop and cardinal
Marc'Antonio Mazzoleni (died 1632), Italian engineer
Marcantonio Memmo (1536–1615), Doge of Venice
Marcantonio Michiel (1484–1552), Venetian noble
Marcantonio Negri (died 1624), Italian composer, singer and music director
Marc'Antonio Pasqualini (1614–1691), Italian opera singer
Marcantonio Pellini (1659–1760), Italian painter
Marcantonio Raimondi, 16th-century Italian engraver
Marcantonio Riverditi (died 1744), Italian Baroque painter
Marcantonio Trivisan, Doge of Venice
Marc'Antonio Verità (died 1650), Roman Catholic bishop
Marc'Antonio Ziani (c. 1653 – 1715), Italian composer
Marcantonio Zimara, 16th-century Italian philosopher
Marc'Antonio Zondadari (1658–1722), Italian noble

Italian masculine given names